Serhiy Konovalov (born 1 March 1972, in Poltava) is a Ukrainian current football coach and former football midfielder. He last played for FC Irpin Horenychi.

Career
Konovalov is a product of the Dnipro Higher School of Physical Culture (formerly Dnipropetrovsk Regional sport boarding school).

He capped for USSR Youth Team in 1991 FIFA World Youth Championship.

Konovalov was the first player to score in a competitive match for the Ukraine national team, as he netted after 29 minutes in their third UEFA Euro 1996 qualifying Group 4 match against Estonia, following a 2–0 loss to Lithuania and a 0–0 draw with Slovenia. The match finished 3-0 thanks to an Urmas Kirs own goal and a goal from Timerlan Huseinov. Ukraine eventually finished 4th in the group and failed to qualify for the tournament. Was married. He is now in civil marriage. Three children: Nikita Konovalov, Sonia Konovalova, Nazarii Konovalov.

He played domestically for Dnipro Dnipropetrovsk, Dynamo Kyiv, Arsenal Kyiv and Borysfen Boryspil, as well as for South Korean club Pohang Steelers, Israeli club Beitar Jerusalem, Chinese club Qingdao Beilaite and Azerbaijani club Inter Baku.

International goals
Results list Ukraine's goal tally first.

Coaching career 
Konovalov in July 2011 joined FC Sevastopol as assistant coach. On 27 November 2013 he was appointed as interim coach of FC Sevastopol.

References

External links
 
 
 
 

1972 births
Living people
Sportspeople from Poltava
Association football midfielders
Soviet footballers
Ukrainian footballers
Ukrainian expatriate footballers
Ukraine international footballers
Ukrainian Premier League players
FC Dnipro players
FC Dynamo Kyiv players
Pohang Steelers players
Beitar Jerusalem F.C. players
FC Arsenal Kyiv players
FC Borysfen Boryspil players
FC Systema-Boreks Borodianka players
Shamakhi FK players
K League 1 players
Qingdao Hainiu F.C. (1990) players
FC Irpin Horenychi players
Chinese Super League players
Expatriate footballers in South Korea
Expatriate footballers in Israel
Expatriate footballers in China
Expatriate footballers in Azerbaijan
Ukrainian expatriate sportspeople in South Korea
Ukrainian expatriate sportspeople in Israel
Ukrainian expatriate sportspeople in China
Ukrainian expatriate sportspeople in Azerbaijan
Ukrainian football managers
Ukrainian Premier League managers
FC Sevastopol managers